Lambert Barnard, also known as Lambert Bernardi (c.1485–1567), was an English Renaissance painter.

Origins and style 
Barnard's place of birth is unknown. All of his extant works can be found in and around Chichester. His son, Anthony Barnard (1514–1619), and grandson, Lambert, and two descendant generations of painters (both also named Lambert) followed his path and remained in the city.

Barnard worked in dry fresco and with oil on board. His style is characterized by the use of rich colours, heavy black outline, and lavish gilding. His work often suffered from heavy over-painting that obscured the delicacy of his hand, but it is still possible to see his knowledge of contemporary European practice. This hints that he might have served an apprenticeship with a Franco/Flemish workshop before c.1513, entering into the service of Robert Sherborn, Bishop of Chichester from 1508 to 1536. Barnard maintained a small workshop with an apprentice boy, John Foster, and his son, Anthony Barnard, who may also have worked alongside his father in the cathedral on his last commission. Records indicate that in 1533, at Bishop Sherborne's request, the Dean and Chapter of Chichester Cathedral granted Barnard an annual payment in recognition of "his long and good service." Following the bishop's death in 1536, Barnard remained in his tenement in East Street, Chichester, living on his annuity, occasionally updating his work on the portraits of kings and bishops, and making repairs to other works in the cathedral.

Works 
Over the next twenty years in collaboration with the bishop, Barnard executed several works, the foliage and heraldry themed vaults of Chichester Cathedral (from c.1513); a domestic wall painting in the Vicar's Close in Chichester; a series of "The Nine Ladies Worthy", or "Heroines of Antiquity" referred to as "The Amberley Panels" (c.1526) for one of the bishop's residences, Amberley Castle; the Italianate heraldic ceiling of the Tudor Room of the Bishop's Palace in Chichester (c.1524–1528)  and his most important work, " Chichester Cathedral Charter History Paintings" (1533). This latter is a large scheme originally displayed in the south transept of Chichester Cathedral and depicts its early foundation at Selsey with the West Saxon King Caedwalla granting the See of Selsey to St Wilfrid and secondly, its continuation at Chichester showing Henry VIII Confirming to Bishop Sherborn the Royal Protection of Chichester Cathedral. These two conjoined panels are framed above an attached series of roundels of portrait heads of the early kings and queens of England and hang in the south transept. Following the collapse of the cathedral spire in 1861 the rest of the scheme, a Catalogus Episcopi, painted roundels of the Bishops of Selsey and Chichester, was moved to the north transept. In its entirety it also offers a commentary on the historic authority of the Roman Catholic Church in England and the political events leading up to the changes of the Reformation. The recent dating of this scheme in 1533 makes it an original statement hugely important to the history of English art.

Other works 
Barnard appears to have spent his working life within Chichester and its immediate area. However, around 1532, he was employed by Sherborn's colleague and executor Thomas West, 9th Baron De La Warr, to decorate the vaults of nearby Boxgrove Priory with West's family heraldry; he may also have been the "Mr. Barnard" responsible for supplying a now lost altarpiece of the Conception for the high altar of St Margaret's Church, Westminster in 1545.

 

There is a copy of John Lydgate's "Troy Book and Siege of Thebes" in the British Library. The book was originally made for Sir William Herbert, 1st Earl of Pembroke, at some time before 1462, and partially illustrated with eight miniatures. The decoration was  completed, between 1516 and 1523, with a further seventeen miniatures that have been attributed to Barnard. However the evidence for this has been inconclusive, with the antiquarian Edward Croft-Murray describing any connection as "very tentative".

As English paintings of the early sixteenth century that were produced outside the ambiance of the royal court, Lambert Barnard's surviving work is rare and should be seen as an important indicator of English regional painting of that time.

Notes

References

Sources

Further reading
 
 
 

1485 births
1576 deaths
16th-century English painters
English male painters
People from Chichester